Ahmed Khairy was an Egyptian sprinter. He competed in the men's 100 metres at the 1920 Summer Olympics.

References

Year of birth missing
Year of death missing
Athletes (track and field) at the 1920 Summer Olympics
Egyptian male sprinters
Olympic athletes of Egypt
Place of birth missing